In horse racing in Japan, The Classics are a series of horse races run over the flat. Each classic is run once each year and is restricted to intact horses that are three years old (i.e., excluding geldings). The five races are:

Triple crown for male horse 
In the past, won Satsuki Sho, Japan Derby and Kikuka Sho triple crown title male horse in Japan. 

 St Lite (1941)
 Shinzan (1964)
 Mr C B (1983)
 Symboli Rudolf (1984)

 Narita Brian (1994)
 Deep Impact (2005)
 Orfevre (2011)
 Contrail (2020)

Triple crown for female horse 
In the past, won Oka Sho, Japan Oaks and Shuka Sho (from 1996) (Not a classic race, but included in the Triple Crown)(Queen Elizabeth II Cup, from 1976 to 1995; Victoria Cup, from 1970 to 1975) triple crown title female horse in Japan. 

 Mejiro Ramonu (1986)
 Still in Love (2003)
 Apapane (2010)

 Gentildonna (2012)
 Almond Eye (2018)
 Daring Tact (2020)

See also 
 British Classic Races
 American Classic Races
 French Classic Races

Horse races in Japan